Bio De Casseres (née Adella Mary Terrill; born 1875) was an American author.

Early life 
She was born in Lake Crystal or Blue Earth Reservation in Minnesota. De Casseres's grandfather was Stephen Mack, an early Euro-American settler in Illinois. She was educated in Mankato before travelling to Pueblo with her sister Sadie to help their stepsister Matilda Provost. In Colorado she met her first husband with whom she lived in Tonopah. While accompanying her husband on a business trip to New York, the then named Adella met journalist Benjamin De Casseres. For fourteen years they sent love letters back and forth without seeing one another. Eventually the letters affected her marriage and she divorced in 1919. In 1920 she married De Casseres, who wrote for Hearst's New York Journal.

Career 
She published at least two novels. In 1926 The Boy of Bethlehem came the Christopher press in New York. Later she published The Star Baby, a Fantasy in One Act, in which she contributed couplets and Winifred Dunn contributed to the dramatization.

Benjamin and Bio were acquainted with writers and artists living in New York in the 1920s and 1930s. They befriended playwright and Nobel prize winner Eugene O'Neill, among other writers such as H. L. Mencken, Don Marquis, Arthur "Bugs" Baer, William Randolph Hearst and Hype Igoe. In 1928 she helped O'Neil when he was depressed over his divorce. Apparently O'Neill asked De Casseres to "conduct a long-distance reading of his palm."  De Casseres was a patron of writer and artist Clark Ashton Smith, buying drawings from him in 1934.

Personal life 
After her husband died, she moved to Tucson in 1946. In her will she gifted all their possessions to the Rockton Township Historical Society for "the use and benefit of the Ho-no-ne-gah and Stephen Mack Museum."

References

1875 births
20th-century deaths
Year of death missing
People from Minnesota